Józef Abelewicz (17 March 1821 in Anykščiai - 3 July 1882) was a Polish religious figure of the Roman Catholic Church and theologian. He became a professor of theology in Vilnius.

References
 Polish Biographical Dictionary

Polish Roman Catholic theologians
1821 births
1882 deaths
People from Anykščiai